Clausena is a genus of flowering plants in the citrus family, Rutaceae. It was first defined by the Dutch botanist Nicolaas Laurens Burman in 1768. It is distributed in Africa, southern Asia, Australia, and the Pacific Islands.

This genus is in the subfamily Aurantioideae, which also includes genus Citrus. It is in the subtribe Clauseninae, which are known technically as the remote citroid fruit trees.

Clausena was named for the Norwegian clergyman, Peder Claussøn Friis (1545-1614), the translator of the Icelandic historian and poet, Snorri Sturluson.

Description
The genus includes shrubs and trees. Some species are variable, with many forms. The leaves of these plants are pinnate, divided into leaflets. The inflorescence varies in form, but is generally a cluster of several flowers with 4 or 5 petals and sepals. The fruit is a berry which lacks the pulp of many other fruits in the citrus family. The genus can be distinguished from related plants by the presence of a gynophore, a structure supporting the ovary in the flower. It looks very different in the various species, however, and can be hard to recognize.

Uses
C. anisata is a tree used for its wood, and in traditional medicine. C. excavata is used medicinally in Asia for a variety of conditions, including snakebite, malaria, dysentery, and HIV infection. Some species, such as C. indica and C. lansium (wampi), produce edible fruit. Wampi is cultivated as a fruit tree, and though it is only a remote relative of citrus, it can be grafted to various citrus trees. There are sour, sweet, and intermediate varieties of C. lansium.

Fossil record
A Clausena leaf fossil from the Oligocene of Ethiopia, represents so far the oldest record of the genus.

Diversity
The taxonomy of the genus is unclear. There are between about 15 and 30 species. Many formerly used names were made synonyms in a 1994 revision.

Species include:

Clausena abyssinica 
Clausena anisata– horsewood
Clausena anisum-olens (syn. C. sanki, nom. rejic.)
Clausena austroindica 
Clausena brevistyla
Clausena dentata
Clausena engleri
Clausena excavata
Clausena harmandiana 
Clausena henryi
Clausena heptaphylla 
Clausena indica 
Clausena inolida
Clausena kanpurensis 
Clausena lansium– wampi, wampee, Chinese clausena
Clausena lenis
Clausena luxurians  
Clausena poilanei
Clausena smyrelliana
Clausena wallichii

References

External links
  
 

 
Aurantioideae genera
Taxa named by Nicolaas Laurens Burman